Pratima Sherpa (born 27 November 1999) is the first ranked amateur female golfer from Nepal. She was born and raised in a maintenance shed behind the third hole of the Royal Nepal Golf Club in Kathmandu. Her parents still live on the grounds of the golf course, where her father Pasang Sherpa works as a security guard and mother Kalpana Sherpa works as a maintenance worker.

Sherpa entered her first tournament at age 11 and won 33 trophies over the next six years. After being profiled by the Nepali Times in 2016, she attracted international attention and was invited to meet golf legend Tiger Woods. She subsequently moved to California to train and attend Santa Barbara City College, where she was named Women's Golfer of the Year in 2020.

Forbes magazine included her in the 2020 edition of the '30 under 30' list of Asian personalities in entertainment and sports.

References

Nepal
Sportspeople from Kathmandu
1999 births
Living people